Mervi Väisänen (born Mervi Pesu ; born 2 May 1973) is a Finnish ski-orienteering and mountain bike orienteering competitor. 

She won a bronze medal in the long distance at the 2002 World Ski Orienteering Championships in Borovetz. She won a silver medal at the 2002 World MTB Orienteering Championships, after finishing seven seconds behind gold medalist Laure Coupat.

She won a bronze medal in the middle distance at the 2015 World Ski Orienteering Championships, behind Milka Reponen and Marjut Turunen.

See also
 Finnish orienteers
 List of orienteers
 List of orienteering events

References

1973 births
Living people
Finnish orienteers
Female orienteers
Mountain bike orienteers
Ski-orienteers
Finnish female cyclists
Finnish mountain bikers